The Mikulin AM-37 was a Soviet aircraft piston engine designed prior to Russia's entry into World War II. An improved version of the Mikulin AM-35 V-12 engine, it was only produced in small numbers because of its unreliability.

Development
Design work on a development of the AM-35 with boosted supercharging and an intercooler positioned behind the supercharger began on the factory's initiative in December 1939. A batch of ten prototypes was completed in 1940 and bench-testing began on 5 January 1941. It passed its State acceptance trials the following April and was approved for production. It was tested in a variety of aircraft, but proved to be unreliable and prone to overheating. Factory No. 24 in Moscow built only twenty-nine AM-37s, as the new engine was designated, in 1941 before the German advance forced the factory to evacuate in October. Mikulin had been unable to resolve the issues with the AM-37 in the meantime and production was not resumed.

Variants
AM-37A
AM-37TK
TK for toorbokompressor. Planned version with a turbocharger, no further information known.
AM-37P
P for Pushechnyy or cannon. A 1940 project for a model with an autocannon mounted in the space between the cylinders, firing through a hollow reduction-gear shaft. No further information available.
Am-37u/v or AM-37UV
UV for udlinyonniy val or lengthened shaft. An engine with a lengthened shaft and remote gearing for use in the Gudkov G-1 fighter that carried the engine behind the pilot. Ordered developed in 1940 and design work started in 1941, but it was not completed.

Applications
Mikoyan-Gurevich MiG-1
Mikoyan-Gurevich MiG-3
Mikoyan-Gurevich DIS
Polikarpov TIS
Tupolev Tu-2
Yermolaev Yer-2

Specifications

See also

References

Notes

Bibliography

Mikulin aircraft engines
1940s aircraft piston engines